Nkosinathi Emmanuel Dlamini is a South African politician who has been a Member of Parliament (MP) for the African National Congress.

References 

Living people
Members of the National Assembly of South Africa
African National Congress politicians
21st-century South African politicians
Politicians from KwaZulu-Natal
Year of birth missing (living people)